Rhodopsin kinase (rod opsin kinase, G-protein-coupled receptor kinase 1, GPCR kinase 1, GRK1, opsin kinase, opsin kinase (phosphorylating), rhodopsin kinase (phosphorylating), RK, STK14) is a serine/threonine-specific protein kinase involved in phototransduction. This enzyme catalyses the following chemical reaction:

 ATP + rhodopsin  ADP + phospho-rhodopsin

Mutations in rhodopsin kinase are associated with a form of night blindness called Oguchi disease.

Function and mechanism of action 
Rhodopsin kinase is a member of the family of G protein-coupled receptor kinases, and is officially named G protein-coupled receptor kinase 1, or GRK1. Rhodopsin kinase is found primarily in mammalian retinal rod cells, where it phosphorylates light-activated rhodopsin, a member of the family of G protein-coupled receptors that recognizes light. Phosphorylated, light-activated rhodopsin binds to the protein arrestin to terminate the light-activated signaling cascade. The related GRK7, also known as cone opsin kinase, serves a similar function in retinal cone cells subserving high-acuity color vision in the fovea. The post-translational modification of GRK1 by farnesylation and α-carboxyl methylation is important for regulating the ability of the enzyme to recognize rhodopsin in rod outer segment disk membranes.

Arrestin-1 bound to rhodopsin prevents rhodopsin activation of the transducin protein to turn off photo-transduction completely.

Rhodopsin kinase is inhibited by the calcium-binding protein recoverin in a graded manner that maintains rhodopsin sensitivity to light despite large changes in ambient light conditions. That is, in retinas exposed to only dim light, calcium levels are high in retinal rod cells and recoverin is bound to and inhibits rhodopsin kinase, leaving rhodopsin exquisitely sensitive to photons to mediate low-light, low-acuity vision; in bright light, rod cell calcium levels are low so recoverin cannot bind or inhibit rhodopsin kinase, resulting in greater rhodopsin kinase/arrestin inhibition of rhodopsin signaling at baseline to preserve visual sensitivity.

According to a proposed model, the N-terminus of rhodopsin kinase is involved in its own activation. It's suggested that an activated rhodopsin binds to the N-terminus, which is also involved in the stabilization of the kinase domain to induce an active conformation.

Eye disease 
Mutation in rhodopsin kinase can result in diseases such as Oguchi disease and retinal degeneration. Oguchi disease is a form of congenital stationary night blindness (CSNB). Congenital stationary night blindness is caused by the inability to send a signal from outer retina to the inner retina by signaling molecules. Oguchi disease is a genetic disorder so an individual can be inherited from his or her parents. Genes that are responsible for Oguchi disease are SAG (which encodes arrestin) and GRK1 genes. Rhodopsin kinase is encoded from the GRK1 gene, so a mutation in GRK1 can result in Oguchi disease.

Retinal degeneration is a form of the retinal disease caused by the death of photoreceptor cells that present in the back of the eye, retina. Rhodopsin kinase directly participates in the rhodopsin to activate the visual phototransduction. Studies have shown that lack of rhodopsin kinase will result in photoreceptor cell death. When photoreceptors cells die, they will be detached from the retina and result in retinal degeneration.

See also 
 Rhodopsin
 Visual phototransduction
 G-protein coupled receptor kinases
 GRK2

References

External links 
 

EC 2.7.11